Potassium salicylate is the potassium salt of salicylic acid.

External links
 http://www.chemicalbook.com/ChemicalProductProperty_EN_CB4157001.htm
 http://www.chemblink.com/products/578-36-9.htm

Salicylates
Potassium compounds
3-Hydroxypropenals